Christophine Reinwald (born Elisabetha Christophine Friederike Schiller; September 4, 1757 – August 31, 1847) was a German artist, the eldest sister of Friedrich Schiller.

Born Elisabetha Christophine Friederike Schiller in Marbach am Neckar, Christophine Reinwald married the librarian  in Meiningen in 1786. The couple had no children. To obtain extra money for the family Christophine gave drawing lessons to the daughters of local families. She was also acquainted with the painter Ludovike Simanowiz. She died in Meiningen.

References

1757 births
1847 deaths
German women painters
18th-century German painters
18th-century German male artists
18th-century German women artists
19th-century German painters
19th-century male artists
19th-century German women artists
People from Marbach am Neckar
Friedrich Schiller